Hu Zhongxiong (born January 1966) is a Chinese politician who is the current party secretary of Guiyang, in office since September 2021. Previously, he served as head of the United Front Work Department of CPC Guizhou Provincial Committee, and vice governor, and before that, mayor of Changsha, party secretary of Yueyang, party secretary and mayor of Yiyang.

Early life and education
Hu was born in Li County, Hunan, in January 1966. He entered Hunan Normal University in 1982, majoring in the Department of Politics. After graduating in 1986, he was admitted to Southwest University of Political Science & Law, earning a master's degree in law in 1989.

Career in Hunan
Hu joined the Communist Party of China (CPC) in April 1985. After university, he taught at Hunan Economic Management Cadre College for several years before becoming involved in politics in June 1995, when he was appointed director of Management Committee of Phoenix Park Economic and Technological Development Zone.

He was deputy secretary of Hunan Provincial Committee of the Communist Youth League of China in January 1997, and held that office until April 2002. He then worked in Yiyang, holding positions as deputy party secretary (2002–2015), mayor (2011–2015), and party secretary (2015–2016). In December 2016, he was appointed party secretary of the neighboring Yueyang city, concurrently serving as chairman of Yueyang People's Congress. In January 2018, he was promoted to become mayor and deputy party secretary of Changsha, and party chief of the Party Working Committee of Xiangjiang New Area. It would be his first job as mayor of a provincial capital city.

Career in Guizhou
In 2020, he was transferred from his job in Hunan province to the neighboring Guizhou province. In January, he was promoted to acting vice governor, confirmed on March 6. He was appointed head of the United Front Work Department of CPC Guizhou Provincial Committee in February 2021 and was admitted to member of the standing committee of the CPC Guizhou Provincial Committee, the province's top authority. On September 17, he took office as party secretary of Guiyang and party chief of the Party Working Committee of Gui'an New Area, replacing .

References

1966 births
Living people
People from Li County, Hunan
Hunan Normal University alumni
Southwest University of Political Science & Law alumni
People's Republic of China politicians from Hunan
Chinese Communist Party politicians from Hunan